The 2022 FIBA 3x3 Africa Cup was the fourth edition of the African 3x3 basketball event which was held between 3 and 4 December, 2022 in Cairo, Egypt. The official venue was in fron t of the Baron Empain Palace. Both men's and women's national teams of Egypt qualified for the 2022 FIBA 3x3 World Cup.

Participating teams

All African National Federations were invited to register a team for the FIBA 3x3 Africa Cup 2022.

Men's

Women's

Men's tournament

Pool stage

Pool A

Pool B

w = win, f = forfeit

Knockout stage 
All times are local.

Final standings

Women's tournament

Pool stage

Pool A

w = win, f = forfeit

Pool B

Knockout stage 
All times are local.

Final standings

References

External links
 Official website

Africa
FIBA
FIBA